Nan Hayden Agle (born Anna Bradford Hayden; April 13, 1905 – February 14, 2006) was an American children's book writer.

Biography
She was born in Baltimore, Maryland to Charles Swett Hayden and Emily Spencer Hayden. She was a granddaughter of the chief editorial writer for the Baltimore Sun, Edward Spencer. She attended Goucher College. She married Harold H. Cecil in 1925, with whom she had two sons but the union ended in divorce. She married, secondly, to John Agle in 1947.  Once her two sons were in school, she returned to Maryland Institute College of Art and earned a fine arts degree, studying with artist Herman Maril.

Nan was an art teacher at Friends School of Baltimore and at the Baltimore Museum of Art, and was a member of Delta Gamma sorority. She and Ellen Wilson co-authored a series of children's books known as the Three Boys series, about the adventures of the fictional triplet boys: Abercrombie, Benjamin and Christopher. The first book of the series, Three Boys and a Lighthouse was completed in 1951. Its success led to more stories about adventures of the triplets, with an adventure in space at the end of the series.

In 1973, she wrote a book titled Susan's Magic later changed into Susan and Sereena and the Cat's Place. Another of her books documented the adventures of a former slave.

Nan Hayden Agle died at the age of 100 at her home in Sykesville, Maryland, following a fall.

Bibliography

Three Boys series
 Three Boys and a Lighthouse, co-authored with Ellen Wilson, Scribner (January 2000), 
 Three Boys and a Tugboat, Scribner (1953), 
 Three Boys and the Remarkable Cow, Charles Scribner's Sons, New York; First Edition (1952), 
 Three Boys and a Train, co-authored with Ellen Wilson, Charles Scribner's Sons (1956), 
 Three Boys and H2O, co-authored with Ellen Wilson, Scribner; first edition (June 1968), 
 Three Boys and a Helicopter, co-authored with Ellen Wilson, Scribner; first edition (1958), 
 Three Boys and a Mine, co-authored with Ellen Wilson, Charles Scribner's Sons; First Printing edition (1954), 
 Three Boys and Space, Scribner (June 1962),

Other books
 Constance the Honeybee, John C. Winston Company (1959), illustrated by Richard Q. Yardley
 Princess Mary of Maryland, Tradition Press (1967), Literary Licensing LLC (2012), illustrated by Aaron Sopher 

 Free to Stay: The True Story of Eliza Benson and the Family She Stood by for Three Generations, Arcadia Enterprises, Inc. (December 28, 2000), 
 A Promise Is to Keep: The True Story of a Slave and the Family She Adopted, Zondervan (December 1985), 
 Susan's magic, Seabury Press (1973), 
 Baney's lake, Seabury Press (1972), 
 That Dog Tarr, Scholastic Book Services; first edition (1966),  illustrated by  Barbara Seuling

 The Ingenious John Banvard, co-authored with Frances Atchinson Bacon, Seabury Press; first edition (1966), 
 The Lords of Baltimore, co-authored with Frances Atchinson Bacon, Holt; first edition (1962),  Holt Rinehart & Winston; 5th Printing edition (1969), illustrated by  Leonard Vosburgh

 My animals and me; An autobiographical story, Seabury Press (1970), 
 Makon and the Dauphin, Charles Schribner's Sons, first edition (1961), 
 Kish's Colt, Seabury Press, New York (1968), 
 Kate and the Apple Tree, Seabury Press (June 1972),

References

Sources
 Commire, Anne.  Something About the Author, Volume 3.  Gale Research, 1972

1905 births
2006 deaths
American centenarians
Goucher College alumni
Writers from Baltimore
People from Sykesville, Maryland
American children's writers
Women centenarians
Accidental deaths in Maryland
Accidental deaths from falls